This is a list of various names the Algonquins have been recorded.

Endonyms

Anishinaabe(g)
The most general name for the Algonquins is Anishinaabe.  Though several definitions are given for this name, the most common one is "spontaneous men", referring to their creation as being ex nihlo, thus being the "Original men." When syncoped, the name appears as "Nishnaabe".
 Anicinàpe(k). — Algonquin roman orthography.
 Anishinaabe(g). — Fiero "double vowel" roman orthography.

Odishkwaagamii(g)
Among the Anishinaabe peoples, the Nipissings and the Algonquins are collectively called Odishkwaagamii(g) (syncoped as Dishkwaagmii(g)), meaning "[those] at the end of the lakewater," but Jean Cuoq translates the name as "[those] at the last water," from ishkwaa ("end") and gami ("lakewater"). Chamberlain prefers "[people] on the otherside of the lake" though Chamberlin's translation would be for the Odagaamii(g) — the Fox. Among the Nipissings, though, they call themselves Odishkwaagamii(g) and call the Algonquins Omaamiwinini(wag) — the "downstream man (men)".
 Odishkwaagamii(g). — Fiero "double vowel" roman orthography.
 Otickwàgamì(k). — Algonquin roman orthography.

Omaamiwinini(wag)
Omaamiwinini(wag) — the "downstream man (men)" — is a name generally used by the Nipissings and some Algonquins to describe themselves.
 Omàmiwinini(wak). — Algonquin roman orthography.
 Omaamiwinini(wag). — Fiero "double vowel" roman orthography.

Exonyms

Algonquin(s)
The term "Algonquin" has been suggested to derive from the Maliseet word elakómkwik, "they are our relatives/allies".
 Alagonkins. — Croghan (1765) in Monthly American Journal of Geology, 272, 1831.
 Algokin. — McKenzie quoted by Tanner, Narratives, 332, 1830.
 Algomeequin. — Schoolcraft, Indian Tribes, I, 306, 1851.
 Algomequins. — Schoolcraft, Indian Tribes, V, 38, 1855
 Algommequin. — Champlain (1632), Œuvres, V, pt. 2, 193, 1870.
 Algomquins. — Sagard (1636), Canada, I, 247, 1866.
 Algoncains. — Hennepin, New Discoveries, 95, 1698.
 Algongins. — Tracy (1667) in New York Documents of Colonial History, III, 153, 1853.
 Algonguin. — Morse, North America, 238, 1778.
 Algonic Indians. — Schoolcraft, Indian Tribes, I, 38, 1851.
 Algonkins. — Hennepin (1683) in Harris, Voyage and Travel, II, 916, 1705.
 Algonméquin. — Martin in Bressani, Relations Abrégée, 319, 1653.
 Algonovins. — Alcedo, Dictionary of Geography, V, 120, 1789.
 Algonquains. — Jesuit Relations: 1653, 3, 1858.
 Algonquens. — Schoolcraft, Indian Tribes, II, 358, 1852.
 Algonquin. — Jesuit Relations: 1632, 14, 1858.
 Algoomenquini. — Keane in Stanford, Compendium, 500, 1878.
 Algoquins. — Lewis and Clark, Travels, I, map, 1817.
 Algoquois. — Audouard, Far West, 207, 1869.
 Algouinquins. — Gorges (1658) in Maine Historical Society Collections, II, 67, 1847.
 Algoumekins. — Gallatin in Transactions and Collections of the American Antiquarian Society, II, 24, 1836.
 Algoumequini. — De Laet (1633) quoted by Vater, Mithridates, pt. 3, sec. 3, 404, 1816.
 Algoumequins. — Champlain (1603), Œuvres, II, 8, 1870.
 Algumenquini. — Kingsley, Standard National History, pt. 6, 147, 1883.
 Alinconguins. — Nicolls (1666) in New York Documents of Colonial History, II, 147, 1853.
 Alkonkins. — Hutchins (1778) quoted by Jefferson, Notes, 141, 1825.
 Alquequin. — Lloyd in Journal of Anthropological Institute of Great Britain, IV, 44, 1875.
 Altenkins. — Clinton (1745) in New York Documents of Colonial History, VI, 281, 1855 (misprint).
 Attenkins. — Clinton (1745) in New York Documents of Colonial History, VI, 276, 1855.

Akwanake
The general name for any unspecified non-Iroquoian groups, including the Algonquins, were called "Akwanake"—"Strangers"—by the Iroquoian peoples.
 Akwanake. — Brebœuf quoted by Schoolcraft, Indian Tribes, IV, 207, 1854.

Other
 Abnaki. — A variation of Waabanakii(g) — Easterner(s).

See also
 Nipissing ethnonyms
 Ojibwa ethnonyms
 Potawatomi ethnonyms

Notes

References
 J. Mooney and C. Thomas. "Algonkin" in Handbook of American Indians North of Mexico'', edited by Frederick Webb Hodge (Smithsonian Institution, Bureau of American Ethnology Bulletin 30. GPO: 1910.)

 
Anishinaabe culture

Native American-related lists